Millidge is a surname of British Isles origin, and may refer to:

 A. F. Millidge (1914-2012), British arachnologist
 Gary Spencer Millidge (1961 -), British comic book creator
 Thomas Millidge (circa 1735–1816), Canadian politician
 Thomas Millidge, Jr. (1776-1838), Canadian politician

Surnames of British Isles origin